The 1894–95 FA Cup was the 24th season of the world's oldest association football competition, the Football Association Challenge Cup (more usually known as the FA Cup). The cup was won by Aston Villa, who defeated West Bromwich Albion 1–0 in the final of the competition, played at Crystal Palace in London. This was Villa's second victory in the FA Cup.

The Trophy was stolen from a display in the shop window of W. Shillcock (a football fitter) in Newton Row, Birmingham, after the Final and never recovered despite a £10 reward. According to the Police, it was taken sometime between 21:30 on Wednesday 11 September and 7:30 the following morning, along with cash from a drawer. The cup was replaced by a copy of the original, made by Howard Vaughton, the former Aston Villa player and England international, who had opened a silversmith's business after his retirement from the game.

Matches were scheduled to be played at the stadium of the team named first on the date specified for each round, which was always a Saturday. If scores were level after 90 minutes had been played, a replay would take place at the stadium of the second-named team later the same week. If the replayed match was drawn further replays would be held at neutral venues until a winner was determined. If scores were level after 90 minutes had been played in a replay, a 30-minute period of extra time would be played.

Calendar
The format of the FA Cup for the season had a preliminary round, four qualifying rounds, three proper rounds, and the semi-finals and final.

First round proper
The first round proper contained sixteen ties between 32 teams. The 16 First Division sides were given a bye to this round, as were Notts County, Darwen, Bury, Newcastle United, Newton Heath and Woolwich Arsenal from the Second Division. The other Second Division sides were entered into the first round qualifying, with the exceptions of Burton Swifts, who started in the second round qualifying, and Manchester City, who played no part in the season's competition. Of the qualifying League sides, only Burton Wanderers and Leicester Fosse qualified to the FA Cup proper. Eight non-league sides also qualified.

The matches were played on Saturday, 2 February 1895. One match was drawn, with the replay taking place in the following midweek fixture. The Barnsley St Peter's – Liverpool game was voided following a dispute over extra time being played.  The match was replayed nine days later, resulting in a 4–0 win to Liverpool.

Second round proper
The eight Second Round matches were scheduled for Saturday, 16 February 1895. There were two replays, played in the following midweek fixture.

Third round proper
The four Third Round matches were scheduled for Saturday, 2 March 1895. There were no replays.

Semi-finals

The semi-final matches were both played on Saturday, 16 March 1895. Aston Villa and West Bromwich Albion went on to meet in the final at Crystal Palace.

Final

The Final was contested by Aston Villa and West Bromwich Albion at Crystal Palace. Aston Villa won 1–0, with Bob Chatt being credited with scoring the fastest goal in FA Cup Final history, scored after just 30 seconds. Devey found Hodgetts, whose cross was laid off by Athersmith to Chatt, whose half volley took a deflection.

Match details

See also
FA Cup Final Results 1872-

References
General
Official site; fixtures and results service at TheFA.com
1894-95 FA Cup at rsssf.com
1894-95 FA Cup at soccerbase.com

Specific

1894-95
1894–95 in English football
FA